Asporina (minor planet designation: 246 Asporina) is a sizeable main-belt asteroid. It is classified as one of the few A-type asteroids.

It was discovered by A. Borrelly on 6 March 1885 in Marseilles and was named after Asporina, a goddess worshipped on Mount Asporenus, Asia Minor.

The spectrum of 246 Asporina reveals the strong presence of the mineral olivine, a relative rarity in the asteroid belt.

References

External links
 The Asteroid Orbital Elements Database
 Minor Planet Discovery Circumstances
 Asteroid Lightcurve Data File
 
 

Background asteroids
Asporina
Asporina
A-type asteroids (Tholen)
A-type asteroids (SMASS)
18850306